The 1968 Fresno State Bulldogs football team represented Fresno State College—now known as California State University, Fresno—as a member of the California Collegiate Athletic Association (CCAA) during the 1968 NCAA College Division football season. Led by third-year head coach Darryl Rogers, Fresno State compiled an overall record of 7–4 with a mark of 4–0 in conference play, winning the CCAA title. As champion, the Bulldogs qualified for the 1968 Camellia Bowl, which was played in Sacramento, California against the champion of the Far Western Conference, the Humboldt State Lumberjacks. Humboldt State prevailed, 29–14.

The Bulldogs played home games at Ratcliffe Stadium on the campus of Fresno City College in Fresno, California. This was the last season Fresno State competed in the NCAA College Division and the CCAA. The following year, Bulldogs moved to the NCAA University Division and became a charter member of the Pacific Coast Athletic Association (PCAA).

Schedule

Team players in the NFL
The following were selected in the 1969 NFL Draft.

References

Fresno State
Fresno State Bulldogs football seasons
California Collegiate Athletic Association football champion seasons
Fresno State Bulldogs football